The Bwatiye people which are mostly refer to as Bachama are a set of people that can be found in Numan, Demsa and Lamurde Local Governments in the Southern part of Adamawa State and in some part of the Cameroons Republic.

History 
The Bwatiye people origin can be traced back to the Gobir people. According to history, Gobir people who occupied Niger territory and some Northwestern Nigeria. They were powerful and brave due to their mastery and skills in battle and artwork. However, they were over powered by the Tuaregs who came from Egypt and were forced to move down to south which is now called the northeastern Nigeria. Also, persistence war from Bornu people forced them to their present location, Adamawa State.

Language 
Bwatiye people speak Bachama language.

Festivals

Bachama Kwete annual cultural festival 

It is a seven days spiritual-cultural festival that is done to honour their vegetarian god (Homonpwa ka Puledan) for the bounty of agricultural produces.

Njuwa Fishing Festival of Bwatiye people 
It is a two days fishing festival that attracts many fishermen around the country to display their fishing skills. It has no specific date but it mostly come up in the month of April.

Vunon Festival 
It is popularly known as Farai-Farai. It is a four-days festival that tends to unite Demsa, Mbula, Numan and Lamurde in worshipping their common deities and to also declare farming activities open. It is one of the biggest festival of the Bwatiye people that involved singing, dancing and displaying of numerous ornaments.

Traditional Governance 

The Bwatiye people used monarchy system of government and the title given to their ruler is Hama Bachama. The current Hama Bachama is DanieI Shaga Ismaila.

References 

Adamawa State
Ethnic groups in Nigeria